Pins Are Lucky is a 1914 silent comedy film featuring Oliver Hardy.

Plot

Cast
 Billy Bowers as Cyrus Singleton
 Frances Ne Moyer as Ruth Singleton
 Oliver Hardy as Peter Pelton (as O.N. Hardy)
 Raymond McKee as John Cozens

See also
 List of American films of 1914
 Oliver Hardy filmography

External links

1914 films
American silent short films
American black-and-white films
1914 comedy films
1914 short films
Films directed by Frank Griffin
Silent American comedy films
American comedy short films
1910s American films